The 1971 Moroccan coup d'état attempt, known popularly as the Skhirat coup d'état was a failed attempt by rebel military leaders to overthrow King Hassan II of Morocco on 10 July 1971, during his forty-second birthday party. It was the first of two attempted coups during Hassan's rule. It was organized by a rebel faction of the Royal Armed Forces led by Lieutenant-Colonel M'hamed Ababou and General Mohamed Medbouh. 

The faction attacked the King's summer palace in Skhirat, the Radio-Maroc headquarters, and offices of the Ministry of Interior in Rabat. Hassan, his immediate family, and his aides escaped and hid in a bathroom near the palace's pool, and the rebels were captured by members of the Royal Guard.

Background
Lieutenant-Colonel M'hamed Ababou was the head of the Ahermoumou military school. Ababou had been described as a Nasserist and previously expressed frustration over government corruption and abuse. He had planned for the coup to take place on 14 May, the same day as a military parade. Ababou had been planning to overthrow the King since 1968. 

His brother, Mohamed Ababou, also took part in the plot. His involvement in planning the coup is unclear. 

General Mohamed Medbouh was Inspector General of the Moroccan Royal Guard, he was the head of the Royal Military Cabinet. Medbouh was implicated in an assassination plot against the King in 1963. Both Ababou and Medbouh were Riffians from the Gzenaya tribe.

In April 1971, Medbouh went to the United States to receive medical treatment after suffering from a mild heart attack. He was asked by Hassan II to write a report on why Pan Am had abandoned plans to build an Intercontinental Hotel in Casablanca in collaboration with Pakistan International Airlines. He had discovered that Pan Am had been asked by a businessman, Omar Benmessaoud, for "sizable commissions" in exchange for permission to build the hotel. Benmessaoud claimed to be close to the King, and suggested that Pan Am should "also pay 600 million to the King" in addition to his "sizable commission". Pan Am had informed the U.S. Secretary of State about the situation. Medbouh was also informed of a phosphate trafficking ring involving dignitaries in the King's entourage.

Four ministers were fired after Medbouh reported his findings to King Hassan. This angered Medbouh, who felt that it was not enough and that the ministers should have also been criminally charged. Omar Benmessaoud was arrested after the coup attempt.   

Inspired by Gamal Abdel Nasser and the 1952 Egyptian coup, Medbouh started to gather officials from the Royal Armed Forces to capture the King and forcefully take over the monarchy to set up a "revolutionary council" to "rid the country of corruption". Ababou and Medbouh convinced five of the Royal Armed Forces' fourteen generals to take part in the coup attempt, promising that they would later become part of the "revolutionary council" after the coup.

Attack

Attack in Skhirat 
On 10 July 1971, at 14:08 (GMT), up to 1,400 cadets from the Ahermoumou military training academy led by Ababou stormed the King's palace in Skhirat during his birthday reception and attacked the guests with automatic weapons and grenades. Between 400 and 800 guests were present at Hassan's forty-second birthday reception. 

The cadets were told that the King was in danger and that they had to shoot and kill alleged insurgents in order to "save" him. Ababou had reportedly told cadets that the King was being held captive by "subversives and trade unionists". 

The soldiers had been allegedly drugged with amphetamines. Captured cadets were found carrying Benzedrine on them. According to eyewitnesses, the cadets were reportedly enraged after seeing the luxurious gathering. Guests were told to lie down with their hands behind their backs, and cadets cursed at foreign diplomats that were attending the reception.

Hassan, his immediate family, and his aides fled and escaped unharmed by hiding in the bathroom of a small pavilion next to the palace's pool. Guests fled to the nearby beach.

During the attack, Medbouh found the King's hiding spot and asked to negotiate with Hassan. He had blamed Ababou for the attack and asked Hassan to come out. Hassan refused to talk to Medbouh, and Medbouh later ordered a soldier to stand sentinel and not to let anyone leave or enter.

When the firing died down, the King later re-emerged to find himself face to face with a rebel cadet, who apologized for not recognizing him. The King ordered the cadet to bring three of his comrades and recited the first chapter of the Quran, Al-Fatiha. The cadets joined in and shouted, "Long live the King!" The attack lasted an hour and a half.

Mohamed Medbouh's death 
There are conflicting reports on Mohamed Medbouh's death. Hassan claimed that Medbouh was accidentally killed by his men during a fight between Medbouh and Dr. Fadel Benyaich over Benyaich's machine gun, while Gen. Mohamed Oufkir, then interior minister, claimed that Medbouh was killed by royalist troops at the Interior Ministry's offices in Rabat.

It was also rumoured that M'hamed Ababou or his right-hand man, Harrouch Akka, shot and killed Medbouh during a power struggle. Medbouh had wished for Hassan II to abdicate and have a regency council in power, whereas Ababou wanted to set up a republic led by the army.

Attacks in Rabat 
The Ministry of Interior, the headquarters of the Royal Armed Forces, and the Radio-Maroc headquarters were attacked by rebel soldiers led by Ababou at 17:45. Ababou had ordered the rebels to come to Rabat after Medbouh's death.

Seventy-five people were held hostage at Radio-Maroc, including Egyptian singer Abdel Halim Hafez. Ababou ordered Hafez to announce the military refused, Hafez refused, which angered Ababou. Composer Abdessalam Amer volunteered to read a speech claiming that the King was dead, that the "people's army" had taken over, and that a republic was proclaimed. 

Ababou gave orders to rebels from the station, he had ordered the execution of everyone in the palace by asking that "dinner be served to everyone by 7 pm".

During the attacks, Radio Tanger dismissed the claims of Hassan's death, and affirmed that the King was still alive and in control.

News agencies were running Hassan's obituary while Libyan radio was rejoicing at the news of Hassan's death. Egypt's state-run newspaper, Al-Ahram, was also celebrating Hassan's death, which led to a diplomatic crisis between Morocco and the two countries. 

When the rebel troops started attacking the headquarters of the Royal Armed Forces, M'hamed Ababou was killed in a shoot-out with loyalist troops led by Maj. Gen. Mohamed Bachir El Bouhali to detain Ababou. After being shot in the neck, Ababou reportedly asked his right-hand man, Harrouch Akka, to shoot and finish him in order for him to not be captured alive. Loyalist troops later sealed off government buildings and patrolled Rabat's streets in tanks.

Victims 

The coup attempt led to 282 deaths, including 20 loyalist soldiers, 2 police officers, 160 rebel cadets, and 98 guests in Skhirat. 

The victims killed include:

 Ahmed Bahnini, former prime minister of Morocco;
 Fadel Benyaich, the King's personal doctor;
 , doctor for the royal family, died while assisting the wounded;
 Marcel Dupret, Belgium's ambassador to Morocco;
 , businessman;
 Pierre Kremer, chef for the la Tour Hassan Palace hotel;
 Ahmed Wafik Maâzouzi, chargé de mission at the Royal Cabinet;
 Abdelmalek Faraj, former Moroccan health minister, died while helping a wounded man;

Aftermath 

The coup attempt ended the same day, rebel cadets later surrendered to loyalists after both coup leaders were dead. Among the rebels, 158 were killed in crossfire with loyalists, and 1,081 were captured. The army closed the Port of Casablanca and surrounded the Libyan embassy for a day to prevent rebels from potentially escaping. 

The next day, King Hassan attended the state funeral of 20 loyalist soldiers that died in the coup attempt. King Hussein of Jordan accompanied Hassan at the funerals. The same day, he had allegedly told minister M'hamed Boucetta that "these people have humiliated me; they must pay, not with the blow of a revolver, that is quickly done, but slowly, like a bag of sugar in ice water".

Three days after the attack, on 13 July, ten high-ranking officers were stripped of their ranks and executed at El-Menzel shooting range, without trial, for their involvement in the plot. The executions were filmed and broadcast on national television. Some officers were shouting, "Long live the King, Glory to Hassan II!", during their execution. Members of the Royal Armed Forces gathered to spit on the officers' dead bodies.

King Hassan initially blamed the attack on trade unions and left-wing parties. He dismissed the coup as "undeveloped in the worst sense of the term" and as "a Libyan-style coup, with everything that goes along with it, including its childishness and imperfection". He also pointed to foreign interference as 600 Moroccans had attempted to renew their passports in Cairo on the day of the attack. 

He had suggested that Medbouh wished him "no personal harm", while calling him "schizoid and paranoid" and comparing him to Charles Manson.

King Hassan led a reform of the Royal Armed Forces after the attack, naming Mohamed Oufkir as Minister of Defense. Oufkir would later be accused of orchestrating a second failed coup against Hassan involving Northrop F-5 jets shooting down the King's aircraft.

In 2000, the Association des Familles des Victimes des Événements de Skhirat (AFVES) was formed.

Trial and fate of the rebels 

The rebels were tried at the Permanent Military Court of the Royal Armed Forces in Kenitra, the trial started on 31 January 1972. The court was presided over by Judge Abdenbi Bouachrine, the prosecution was led by Lt.-Col. Ramdane Benayada. 

The cadets were sentenced on 29 February 1972. 1,008 cadets were acquitted. 64 cadets received sentences ranging from 1 to 20 years imprisonment and fines ranging from 150 to 10,000 dirhams.

Lt. Mohammed Raïss was sentenced to death for having murdered Capt. Boujemaâ Asli, Prince Moulay Abdallah's bodyguard, under the orders of M'hamed Ababou. His sentence was later reduced to life in prison. Raïss was freed in September 1992 by royal pardon. 

Capt. Mohamed Chellat, Harrouch Akka, and Sgt. Ghani Achour were sentenced to life in prison. Achour was freed in November 1992. Col. Mohamed Ababou was sentenced to 20 years in prison. Ahmed M'zireg was sentenced to 15 years in prison. 

Ababou, Chellat, M'zireg, and Akka disappeared soon after a failed escape attempt with a group of prisoners, a death certificate was issued in 1976 for Ababou in Er-Rich, a town near Errachida.

Many rebels were transferred from Kenitra Central Prison to the secret prison in Tazmamart, built between 1972 and 1973.

See also 

 1972 Moroccan coup d'état attempt
 History of Morocco
 M'hamed Ababou
 Mohamed Medbouh
 Mohamed Oufkir

Further reading

External links 
 "Bloody Birthday", TIME Magazine, Vol. 98, No. 3, July 19, 1971
"Slaughter at the Summer Palace", TIME Magazine, Vol. 98, No. 4, July 26, 1971
"The Cracked Facade", TIME Magazine, Vol. 98, No. 4, July 26, 1971
Hassan's Military Proves Untrustworthy, US State Department Intelligence Memo
"Le rôle d'Oufkir", le Nouvel Observateur, No. 349, July 19, 1971

References

Notes

Citations

1970s coups d'état and coup attempts
1971 in Morocco
Attempted coups in Morocco
Failed regicides
Republicanism in Morocco
Military history of Morocco
July 1971 events in Africa
Arab rebellions
Mass murder in 1971
Massacres in Morocco